Bunnell is the county seat of Flagler County Florida, United States, with a population of 2,676 at the 2010 census. The city is part of the Deltona–Daytona Beach–Ormond Beach, FL metropolitan statistical area and is named after an early resident, Alvah A. Bunnell, a shingle maker and supplier of wood to the area's fledgling rail industry.

Geography
The city limits now extend south and northwest to the county boundary. Bunnell is bordered to the north and east by the city of Palm Coast.

U.S. Route 1 passes through the center of Bunnell as State Street, leading north  to St. Augustine and southeast  to Ormond Beach.

Bunnell is the second-largest city in the state of Florida (by area) with the annexation of over 87,000 acres (136 square miles) since 2000.

Demographics

As of the census of 2000, there were 2,122 people, 845 households, and 490 families residing in the city. The population density was 455.0 inhabitants per square mile (175.8/km2). The racial makeup of the city was 63.71% White, 32.56% African American, 0.19% Native American, 0.94% Asian, 1.27% from other races, and 1.32% from two or more races. Hispanic or Latino of any race were 3.63% of the population.

There were 845 households, out of which 25.7% had children under the age of 18 living with them, 33.8% were married couples living together, 19.3% had a female householder with no husband present, and 42.0% were non-families. 36.6% of all households were made up of individuals, and 11.2% had someone living alone who was 65 years of age or older. The average household size was 2.29 and the average family size was 3.00.

In the city, the population was spread out, with 23.2% under the age of 18, 9.4% from 18 to 24, 25.0% from 25 to 44, 24.5% from 45 to 64, and 17.9% who were 65 years of age or older. The median age was 40 years. For every 100 females, there were 90.0 males. For every 100 females age 18 and over, there were 88.8 males.

The median income for a household in the city was $21,210, and the median income for a family was $25,231. Males had a median income of $27,500 versus $17,891 for females. The per capita income for the city was $13,274. About 20.1% of families and 22.5% of the population were below the poverty line, including 32.5% of those under age 18 and 13.1% of those age 65 or over.

Architectural landmarks 
Bunnell Water Tower
Lambert House. Oldest existent building in Bunnell. Built by James Frank “Major” Lambert in 1909.
Old Bunnell State Bank Building. Masonry vernacular, 1910. In 1992 was added to the U.S. National Register of Historic Places
George Moody House. Craftsman style, 1917.
William Henry “Doc” Deen House. Frame vernacular, 1918.
Holden House Museum. Craftsman bungalow, 1918. Now owned by the Flagler County Historical Society
Old Flagler County Courthouse. Neoclassical style designed by Wilbur Talley, 1926. Officially dedicated on July 28, 1927.
Little Red School House Museum. Constructed by Bunnell High School Future Farmers of America students in 1938

Notable people 

 Mardy Gilyard, professional football player
 Eddie Johnson, player on United States men's national soccer team
 Bill T. Jones, Tony Award winner for choreography
 Charlie Turner, musician

References

External links

 
 Bunnell Community and Events
 Flagler County Chamber of Commerce
 Flagler County Tourism Office

Cities in Flagler County, Florida
County seats in Florida
Populated places established in 1913
Cities in Florida
1913 establishments in Florida